Carl Wharton is an English actor known for his works in International films such as Saint Dracula 3D, Zombie Massacre, The Perfect Husband, Jaanisaar and The Convent.

Filmography

References

External links 
 Official website
 
 Twitter

21st-century English male actors
English male actors
English male film actors
British actors
British male film actors